Daniel Reddin (12 August 1914 – 2 January 1976) was an Irish basketball player. He competed in the men's tournament at the 1948 Summer Olympics.

References

External links
 

1914 births
1976 deaths
Irish men's basketball players
Olympic basketball players of Ireland
Basketball players at the 1948 Summer Olympics
Sportspeople from Dún Laoghaire–Rathdown
People from Dún Laoghaire